Robert Alai, HSC is a Kenyan blogger and cyber-activist. Alai, who used to run the now defunct information technology weblog at Techmtaa.com has earned notoriety for his stream of social rants. He has been sued and briefly incarcerated for his highly opinionated political and sometimes personal attacks on politicians, government officials and business leaders.

Notable incidents
On 17 June 2019 Robert Alai was arrested in Nairobi and detained for 14 days for sharing gory photos of police officers who were killed by an IED attack in Wajir. In the wake of the Westgate shopping mall attack in Nairobi where over 65 people were killed, Alai was praised, both by local and international media for his timely and creative use of social media, mainly Twitter, to provide updates of what was happening at the mall.  His accounts were considered as being more accurate than - and sometimes contradicting - the updates provided by the authorities.

Controversy and arrests
In December 2014, Ndegwa Muhoro, the Kenya CID Chief, ordered the arrest of Robert Alai for allegedly sharing President Uhuru Kenyatta's contacts on Twitter. He was consequently charged "with undermining Uhuru". Alai's Twitter handle @robertalai was suspended on 18 December 2014, but was later reinstated.

References

External links
Techmtaa.Com

Kenyan bloggers
Year of birth missing (living people)
Living people